Estadio Ministro Brin y Senguel was a football stadium in La Boca district of Buenos Aires, Argentina. It was the home ground of Club Atlético Boca Juniors until the club moved to Brandsen and Del Crucero (current Del Valle Iberlucea) streets in 1924.

Giving the stadiums the names of the streets where they were located in was a common practise in those times. It was owned by club Boca Juniors when the club returned to La Boca in 1916. The club used the stadium until 1924, when it moved to a new venue on Brandsen and Del Crucero (currently Del Valle Iberlucea) streets.

The stadium held a total of 25,000 spectators. It was one of two stadiums that hosted the 1925 South American Championship (currently, Copa América), the other being Sportivo Barracas.

History

The stadium was inaugurated on May 25, 1916, when Boca Juniors played a friendly match vs. Gimnasia y Esgrima de Buenos Aires. That match was not only the first game in that venue but the return of Boca Juniors to the neighborhood that had seen its birth in 1905.

The only Superclásico vs River Plate played at that venue was on July 27, 1919. The match (ended 0–0) would be later annulled by the Association due to the schism that caused the creation of dissident body "Asociación Amateurs de Football".

On June 15, 1924, Boca Juniors played its last match in Ministro Brin and Senguel when the squad beat Sportivo Barracas 3–1 in the 1924 domestic championship.

With Ministro Brin and Senguel as home venue, Boca Juniors won four league, 2 national cups and two international cups, a total of 8 titles.

Bibliography
 David Goldblatt; World Soccer Yearbook; 2002

Notes

References

Sports venues in Buenos Aires
Ministro Brin y Senguel
Ministro Brin y Senguel
Boca Juniors